Events from the year 1782 in France:

Incumbents
 Monarch – Louis XVI

Events
 
25-26 January – Battle of Saint Kitts (American Revolutionary War): A French fleet under the Comte de Grasse clashes with the British in the West Indies
17 February – Battle of Sadras (Anglo-French War (1778–1783)): A French fleet under the Baillie de Suffren clashes with the British in the Bay of Bengal
22 February – Capture of Montserrat from the British
12 April – Battle of the Saintes: A French fleet under de Grasse is defeated by a British fleet under Admiral Rodney
19 April – Battle of the Mona Passage: Four French ships are captured by the British
6 July – Battle of Negapatam: A French fleet clashes with the British in the Bay of Bengal
14 December – The Montgolfier brothers first test fly a hot air balloon in France; it floats nearly 
Ironworks at Le Creusot established; first smelting with coke in France

Arts and culture

Music 
 1 January – First performance of the opera Colinette à la cour

Births
28 August – Antoine Maurice Apollinaire d'Argout, statesman, minister and governor (died 1858)

Full date missing 
Charles-René Laitié, sculptor (died 1862)

Deaths
 
4 January – Ange-Jacques Gabriel, architect (born 1698)
2 March – Princess Sophie of France, princess (born 1734)
6 August – Nicolas Chédeville, composer (born 1705)
21 November – Jacques de Vaucanson, inventor and artist (born 1709)

See also

References

1780s in France